Hoplolaimus columbus is a plant pathogenic nematode.

See also 
 List of soybean diseases
 List of tea diseases
 List of mango diseases
 List of cotton diseases

References

External links 
 Nemaplex, University of California - Hoplolaimus columbus

Tylenchida
Plant pathogenic nematodes
Cotton diseases
Mango tree diseases
Soybean diseases
Tea diseases
Nematodes described in 1963